Route 35 is a common name for roads and highways in many countries.

Route 35 may also refer to:

Route 35 (MTA Maryland), a bus route in Baltimore, Maryland and its suburbs
London Buses route 35

35